A spill metric is a heuristic metric used by register allocators to decide which registers to spill. Popular spill metrics are: 
 cost / degree - introduced in Chaitin's algorithm
 cost / degree2 - emphasizes the spill's effect on neighbours
 cost - emphasizes run time 
 minimising number of spill operations

Where cost is the estimated cost of spilling a value from registers into memory.

Digital registers